was a castle structure in Hioki, Kagoshima Prefecture, Japan.

The date of the castle's construction is unknown, but it is believed that the castle was built by Shimazu Hisanaga in the thirteenth century. It was the original seat of power for the Shimazu clan until 1536, when Shimazu Takahisa relocated the clan leadership to Ichiuji Castle. It was famously the birthplace of the warlords Shimazu Tadayoshi, Shimazu Yoshihisa and Shimazu Yoshihiro.

Owing to its significance to the clan, Izaku castle was retained as a stronghold until 1615. The castle is now only ruins, with nothing but some moats and earthworks remaining.

Gallery

References

Castles in Kagoshima Prefecture
Former castles in Japan
Ruined castles in Japan
Shimazu clan
13th-century establishments in Japan